The 2012–13 Northwestern Wildcats men's basketball team represented Northwestern University in the 2012–13 college basketball season. This was head coach Bill Carmody's thirteenth and final season at Northwestern; on March 16, 2013, the university announced that he would not return to the team. The Wildcats were members of the Big Ten Conference and played their home games at Welsh-Ryan Arena.

2012–13 Roster

Source:

Schedule and results
Source

|-
!colspan=9| Exhibition

|-
!colspan=9| Regular season

|-
!colspan=12| Big Ten tournament

References

Northwestern Wildcats
Northwestern Wildcats men's basketball seasons
Northwestern Wild
Northwestern Wild